Carl Harvey (born 1 October 1958) is a Jamaican born Canadian guitarist and record producer who recorded as a member of Crack of Dawn and The Aggrovators in the 1970s, and later became guitarist for Toots & the Maytals.

Early life and education

Harvey was born in Jamaica and emigrated to Toronto, Ontario, Canada with his family at an early age. He began playing guitar aged 13 and also played the tuba at school.

Career
After listening to music by Jimi Hendrix, Harvey joined the Toronto funk and soul band Crack of Dawn, which was signed by Columbia Records and had hits in Canada with "It's Alright" and "Keep the Faith" in 1976. In the mid-1970s, Harvey visited Jamaica regularly and recorded as a member of Bunny Lee's house band The Aggrovators, playing on albums such as Kaya Dub, Jackie Mittoo's In Cold Blood and King in the Arena, and also played guitar on Willi Williams' Messenger Man. In 1978, he went into the studio with Lee to record several tracks where he played improvised guitar over some of Lee's classic rhythms. These were released in 1979 as the album Ecstasy of Mankind on the British label Cancer.  Although the record was unavailable for many years, it was released by Rhino Records in 1994, who sold it as a Lee "Scratch" Perry album, under the title Guitar Boogie Dub. The album was given a wider release, with correct title and credits, in 2005 by Makasound Records.

In the 1980s, Harvey became the lead guitarist of Toots & the Maytals, and has been with the band for over twenty-five years. The band performed internationally, including in the United States and the United Kingdom.

Harvey also toured with his own band, with Jackie Mittoo, and worked as a record producer, producing four albums by Messenjah (two of which were nominated for Juno Awards), and recordings by the Juno-winning Kim Richardson and Sway. He later played lead guitar in Messenjah.

Harvey released a second solo album, The Times, in 2005.

Solo discography
Ecstasy of Mankind (1979), Cancer
The Times (2005) - Carl Harvey (credited to Carl Harvey & Friends)
Unleashed EP (2012) - Carl Harvey Project

References

External links

1958 births
Living people
Jamaican emigrants to Canada
Black Canadian musicians
Canadian guitarists
Canadian reggae musicians
Musicians from Toronto
Toots and the Maytals members